Viplove Bajoria  (born 15 March 1986) is an Indian politician belonging to the Shiv Sena. He is member of Maharashtra Legislative Council and also serves as the Director of Janata Commercial Co-operative Bank. He represents Hingoli-Parbhani in the Legislative Council. He got elected on 24 May 2018, with this victory he became the youngest member of Legislative Council in the country. He is son of Gopikishan Bajoria who is  serving his third  consecutive term as a legislator from Akola-Buldhana-Washim Constituency.

Positions held
 2018: Elected to Maharashtra Legislative Council

References

External links
 Shivsena website 

Living people
Shiv Sena politicians
1986 births